The Secășița is a right tributary of the river Miniș in Romania. It flows into the Miniș near Secaș.

References

Rivers of Romania
Rivers of Timiș County
Rivers of Arad County